Didier Vavasseur (born 7 February 1961) is a French sprint canoeist.

Career
Vavasseur competed in the 1980s. Participating in two Summer Olympics, he won a bronze medal in the K-4 1000 m event at Los Angeles in 1984.

References
Sports-reference.com profile

1961 births
Canoeists at the 1984 Summer Olympics
Canoeists at the 1988 Summer Olympics
French male canoeists
Living people
Olympic canoeists of France
Olympic bronze medalists for France
Olympic medalists in canoeing
Medalists at the 1984 Summer Olympics